Walter Rudin (May 2, 1921 – May 20, 2010) was an Austrian-American mathematician and professor of Mathematics at the University of Wisconsin–Madison.

In addition to his contributions to complex and harmonic analysis, Rudin was known for his mathematical analysis textbooks: Principles of Mathematical Analysis, Real and Complex Analysis, and Functional Analysis. Rudin wrote Principles of Mathematical Analysis only two years after obtaining his Ph.D. from Duke University, while he was a C. L. E. Moore Instructor at MIT.  Principles, acclaimed for its elegance and clarity, has since become a standard textbook for introductory real analysis courses in the United States.

Rudin's analysis textbooks have also been influential in mathematical education worldwide, having been translated into 13 languages, including Russian, Chinese, and Spanish.

Biography

Rudin was born into a Jewish family in Austria in 1921. He was enrolled for a period of time at a Swiss boarding school, the Institut auf dem Rosenberg, where he was part of a small program that prepared its students for entry to British universities. His family fled to France after the Anschluss in 1938. 

When France surrendered to Germany in 1940, Rudin fled to England and served in the Royal Navy for the rest of World War II, after which he left for the United States. He obtained both his B.A. in 1947 and Ph.D. in 1949 from Duke University. After his Ph.D., he was a C.L.E. Moore instructor at MIT. He briefly taught at the University of Rochester before becoming a professor at the University of Wisconsin–Madison where he remained for 32 years. His research interests ranged from harmonic analysis to complex analysis.

In 1970 Rudin was an Invited Speaker at the International Congress of Mathematicians in Nice. He was awarded the Leroy P. Steele Prize for Mathematical Exposition in 1993 for authorship of the now classic analysis texts, Principles of Mathematical Analysis and Real and Complex Analysis.  He received an honorary degree from the University of Vienna in 2006.

In 1953, he married fellow mathematician Mary Ellen Estill, known for her work in set-theoretic topology. The two resided in Madison, Wisconsin, in the eponymous Walter Rudin House, a home designed by architect Frank Lloyd Wright. They had four children.

Rudin died on May 20, 2010 after suffering from Parkinson's disease.

Selected publications
Ph.D. thesis

Selected research articles
 
 
 
 
 "Totally real Klein bottles in 

Books
Textbooks:
 (1953; 3rd ed., 1976, 342 pp.)
 (1966; 3rd ed., 1987, 416 pp.)
  
 (1973; 2nd ed., 1991, 424 pp.)
Monographs:
 (1962)
 (1969)
Function Theory in the Unit Ball of ℂn. (1980)
Autobiography:
 (1991)

Major awards
 Steele Prize for Mathematical Exposition (1993)

See also

 Helson–Kahane–Katznelson–Rudin theorem
 Rudin–Shapiro sequence
 Rudin's conjecture

References

External links
 
UW Mathematics Dept obituary
MathDL obituary
 
Photos of Rudin Residence
Walter B. Rudin, "Set Theory: An Offspring of Analysis" (1990 Morris Marden Lecture) – YouTube

1921 births
2010 deaths
20th-century American mathematicians
21st-century American mathematicians
Neurological disease deaths in Wisconsin
Deaths from Parkinson's disease
Duke University alumni
Complex analysts
Functional analysts
Mathematical analysts
Operator theorists
University of Wisconsin–Madison faculty
American people of Austrian-Jewish descent
Massachusetts Institute of Technology School of Science faculty
Austrian emigrants to the United States
Institut auf dem Rosenberg alumni